Victor Albert (25 November 1943 – 10 November 2005) was a Belgian politician. He was a member of the Chamber of Representatives.

References
 Engis dit adieu à Vicky Albert, from La Dernière Heure, 12 November 2005

Members of the Chamber of Representatives (Belgium)
1943 births
2005 deaths